Speelland Beekse Bergen is an amusement park and playground near Hilvarenbeek, Netherlands. It is a part of the Beekse Bergen group, which also owns Safaripark Beekse Bergen. The park has been a part of Libéma Exploitatie since 1987. Speelland mainly has playgrounds, a beach, and water attractions.

History
Around the year 1960 a large lake was created between Tilburg and Hilvarenbeek due to a large sand extraction. After a few years the zoo Lion Park Beekse Bergen was opened next to the lake. At the same time another park opened its doors at the other side of the lake: Speelland Beekse Bergen. Later the zoo was renamed Safaripark Beekse Bergen.

At first, Speelland (English: Play Land) mainly aimed at summer recreation. Later the park was enlarged with different playgrounds and attractions, becoming a small attraction park. Speelland is a part of the company Libéma since 1987.

Park
Speelland mainly focusses on families with children until the age of 12. A large part of the park is filled by a sand beach.

Attractions
This is an overview of attractions in Speelland Beekse Bergen. Not all attractions are included with the general entrance fee.

 Wave Rider, a carrousel in the water
 Aquashutlle, children are being launched into the water
 Waterslides
 Sahara buggy-track, children follow a track per buggy
 Trampolines
 Verkeersland (English: Traffic Land), children can drive around in their own 'car'
 Bumpy Boats
 Pedalos, visitors can explore the water per swan-boat
 Midgetgolf
 Funwheels
 Big Wheels
 Minicars  €0,50 per time 
 Kidcars  €2 per time 
 Pony Riding
 Avontureneiland (English: Adventure Island), large playground
 Formula-1-pedal cars
 Water Guns
 Petting Zoo
 Cruise Boat, brings visitors to vacation park Beekse Bergen
 Schommeleiland, (English: Swing-Island), an island with only swings
 Ballenberg, (English: Ballmountain), a climbing tower made out of large balls
 Inflatable pillow
 Power Paddler, children can ride their own boat
 Speelstraat (English: Play Street), large playground

Events
Every season a number of events are being organised in Speelland Beekse Bergen. Most of events carry a theme, such as pirates or cowboys and Indians.

References

Amusement parks in the Netherlands
Buildings and structures in North Brabant
Tourist attractions in North Brabant
Hilvarenbeek